Martinus Schouman (1770– 1848) was a 19th-century painter from the Northern Netherlands.

Biography
Schouman was born in Dordrecht.  According to the RKD he was the pupil and grandnephew of Aert Schouman and the brother of Aert II. His pupils were Pieter Arnout Dijxhoorn, Jan de Greef (1784-1834), Pieter Martinus Gregoor, Matthijs Quispel, Johannes Christiaan Schotel, and his son Izaak Schouman.
He is known for marines and landscapes and was a member of the Dordrecht artist's society Pictura and the Royal society of the fine arts in Brussels.  He died in Breda.

References

Martinus Schouman on Artnet

1770 births
1848 deaths
19th-century Dutch painters
Dutch male painters
Artists from Dordrecht
Dutch landscape painters
Dutch marine artists
19th-century Dutch male artists